Gunniopsis is a genus of flowering plants in the iceplant family, Aizoaceae. These plants are found in areas of inland Australia.

Gunniopis comprises 14 species that were once members of the genera Aizoon, Gunnia and Neogunnia.

The name of the genus honours the botanist and politician Ronald Campbell Gunn. The genus was first formally described by the botanist Ferdinand Pax in 1889 in Engler and Prantl's work Die Naturlichen Pflanzenfamilien. The name is derived from the Greek word opsis meaning resembling which alludes to the resemblance of the genus to the genus Gunnia.

Members of this genus are succulents with the habit of a small shrub or herb.

The plants are widespread throughout the eremaean zones of Western Australia and South Australia with some species extending into the areas in the Northern Territory, Queensland and New South Wales. Found in arid areas the plants are often found in shrubland area with saline soils in and around salt lake systems. The shrub-like Gunniopsis quadrifida has the largest distribution of all the species.

Species
The 14 recognised species belonging to the Gunniopsis genera are listed below:

Gunniopsis calcarea Chinnock Nullarbor gunniopsis or yellow flowered pigface
Gunniopsis calva Chinnock
Gunniopsis divisa Chinnock
Gunniopsis glabra (Ewart) C.A.Gardner
Gunniopsis intermedia Diels yellow salt star
Gunniopsis kochii (R.Wagner) Chinnock Koch's pigface
Gunniopsis papillata Chinnock
Gunniopsis propinqua Chinnock
Gunniopsis quadrifida (F.Muell.) Pax sturts pigface
Gunniopsis rodwayi (Ewart) C.A.Gardner
Gunniopsis rubra Chinnock
Gunniopsis septifraga (F.Muell.) Chinnock green pigface
Gunniopsis tenuifolia Chinnock narrow-leaf pigface
Gunniopsis zygophylloides (F.Muell.) Diels twin-leaf pigface

References

 
Aizoaceae genera